Cranberry Township is one of seven townships in Alleghany County, North Carolina, United States. The township had a population of 375, according to the 2010 census. Before 1880, it was included in Prathers Creek Township.

Cranberry Township occupies  in southwestern Alleghany County. The township's western border is with Ashe County, and the southern border is shared with Wilkes County.

References

Townships in Alleghany County, North Carolina
Townships in North Carolina